Berthold Woltze (born 24 August 1829 in Havelberg; died 29 November 1896 in Weimar) was a German genre painter, portrait painter, and illustrator.

Berthold Woltze was a professor at Weimar Saxon Grand Ducal Art School. In the period from 1871 to 1878 he published numerous of his works in the Gartenlaube newspaper. One of his most famous works is Der lästige Kavalier, translated as "The Irritating Gentleman" or "The Annoying Cavalier."

He is the father of the architectural painter Peter Woltze (1860–1925).

References

External links 
 

1829 births
Genre painters
1896 deaths
German painters